Mount Honaz, is a mountain and a national park, located in southwestern Turkey,  east of the province seat of Denizli. On April 21, 1995, it was proclaimed as a protected area. Honaz, Denizli's depending township that carries the same name as the mountain, is situated on the mountain slopes. At , it is the highest mountain in Turkey's Aegean Region.

The mountain is covered with forests, which are particularly dense in its northern side. Ice and snow are omnipresent around its summit. There has been a project for establishing a ski resort on the mountain a few years ago when the province's marking governor, the late Recep Yazıcıoğlu was in office. However, these plans lie idle for the moment despite the suitable conditions the mountain offers for winter sports.

References

External links
 Miscellaneous images of Mount Honaz National Park

Honaz
National parks of Turkey
Landforms of Denizli Province
Protected areas established in 1995
Tourist attractions in Denizli Province
Two-thousanders of Turkey
Colossae